Henry Irving Dodge (April 11, 1861 - July 28, 1934) was an American writer.  He was best known for creating the character "Skinner" which appeared in Skinner's Dress Suit and a number of additional stories in the 1910s.

Dodge was a great-nephew of Washington Irving and grandson of Major General Richard Henry Dodge who fought in the American Revolution and War of 1812.  He was born in Oswego County, New York.  He studied engineering and law, but preferred writing, and worked for newspapers and magazines.  He did not publish his first novels until he was 45.

In 1916, his story Skinner's Dress Suit was published in The Saturday Evening Post, featuring the character William Manning Skinner, and he continued writing Skinner stories to meet public demand, including Skinner's Baby, Skinner's Big Idea, and Skinner Makes It Fashionable in 1920.  A few Skinner films based on his works were made in the 1910s and 1920s, e.g., Skinner's Baby (1917) and Skinner's Dress Suit (both in 1917 and 1926).  Dodge also wrote plays.

Dodge married Margaret Small in 1902.  Dodge died in New York on July 28, 1934, of angina.  Though his death merited an obituary with photograph in The New York Times, his work has not drawn much attention since his death.

References

External links
 
 
 The Online Books Page for Henry Irving Dodge (University of Pennsylvania)
 Skinner's Dress Suit in Saturday Evening Post (September 23, 1916)

1861 births
1934 deaths
20th-century American short story writers
People from Oswego County, New York